Wilfred Edgar Knothe (May 1, 1903 – March 27, 1963) was a Major League Baseball player. He played two seasons with the Boston Braves (1932–1933) and Philadelphia Phillies (1933).

References

External links

Boston Braves players
Philadelphia Phillies players
Major League Baseball third basemen
Major League Baseball shortstops
Bay City Wolves players
Flint Vehicles players
Des Moines Demons players
Portland Beavers players
Seattle Indians players
Kansas City Blues (baseball) players
Baseball players from New Jersey
Sportspeople from Passaic, New Jersey
1903 births
1963 deaths